Super Junior-K.R.Y. Special Winter Concert is Japan tour concert held by sub-group South Korean boy band Super Junior, Super Junior-K.R.Y. to promote their Japanese single "Promise You". The Japan tour commenced with three shows in Yokohama and end in Tokyo gathering over 72,000 fans.

Setlist

Tour dates

Personnel
 Artists: Super Junior-K.R.Y.: Yesung, Ryeowook and Kyuhyun
 Tour organizer: SM Entertainment
 Tour promoter: Dream Maker Entercom

References

External links 
 Super Junior KRY Official Website 

2012 concert tours
2013 concert tours
Super Junior-K.R.Y concert tours